Vasse is an electoral district of the Legislative Assembly in Western Australia. Vasse is based in the South West region of the state, centred on the town of Busselton and is named for the Vasse River. It has been a safe seat for the Liberal Party at all times since its creation, including as its previous incarnation, Sussex.

The current MLA, Liberal Libby Mettam, won a by-election on 18 October 2014 following the resignation of former Liberal leader Troy Buswell.

Geography
Originally centred on Geographe Bay and Busselton, the redistribution ahead of the 2008 state election expanded the electorate south to include large parts of the Shire of Augusta-Margaret River which had formerly been in Warren-Blackwood prior to that district's abolition. Apart from Busselton and its suburbs, the Vasse district includes the towns of Vasse, Dunsborough/Quindalup, Yallingup, Margaret River, Cowaramup, Gracetown and Prevelly as well as part of Witchcliffe.

History

Vasse was first created for the 1950 state election out of the former seat of Sussex. It is a historically safe seat for the Liberal Party, which has held the seat continuously since its foundation. Indeed, counting its time as Sussex, it has been in the hands of the Liberals and their predecessors since the first Legislative Assembly was convened in 1890. The only time it has been out of the hands of a conservative party was when sitting Liberal Bernie Masters resigned to sit as an independent in 2004–05.

Vasse had only two members in its first 46 years, Stewart Bovell (1950–1971) and Barry Blaikie (1971–1996). Masters succeeded Blaikie at the 1996 state election, but lost preselection for a third term ahead of the 2005 election in favour of then Shire of Busselton mayor Troy Buswell. Masters resigned from the party and contested the election as an independent, but was defeated by Buswell. Buswell served as Liberal leader from January to August 2008, and as Treasurer from 2008 to 2010 and from 2012 to 2014. Buswell resigned in 2014 after a drink-driving controversy, and was succeeded at the resulting by-election by Libby Mettam. The by-election, which was not contested by the opposition Labor Party, saw the National Party cut the Liberal margin in Vasse to less than 4%.

Members for Vasse

Election results

References

External links
 ABC election profiles: 2005 2008
 WAEC district maps: current boundaries, previous distributions

Vasse
Busselton
1950 establishments in Australia
Constituencies established in 1950